The 2007 European Figure Skating Championships was a senior international figure skating competition. Medals were awarded in the disciplines of men's singles, ladies' singles, pair skating, and ice dancing. The event was held at the Torwar Hall in Warsaw, Poland from January 22 through 28.

Qualifying
The competition was open to skaters from European ISU member nations who reached the age of 15 before July 1, 2006. The corresponding competition for non-European skaters was the 2007 Four Continents Championships. Based on the results of the 2006 European Championships, each country was allowed between one and three entries per discipline. National associations selected their entries based on their own criteria.

Medals table

Competition notes
In men's singles, Brian Joubert won his second European title.

In ladies, Carolina Kostner won her first European title. Sarah Meier (silver) became the first Swiss woman to medal at the event since Denise Biellmann in 1981.

In pair skating, Aliona Savchenko / Robin Szolkowy won their first European title. It was Germany's first gold in the event since 1995 when their coach Ingo Steuer won with Mandy Woetzel.

In ice dancing, Isabel Delobel / Olivier Schoenfelder won their first and only European title.

Results

Men

Ladies

Pairs

Ice dancing

References

External links
 2007 European Figure Skating Championships BAD

Further reading
 Figure Skating Today: The Next Wave of Stars by Steve Milton and Gerard Chataigneau (Nov 2, 2007)

European Championships
2007
European 2007
European Figure Skating Championships, 2007
Sports competitions in Warsaw
January 2007 sports events in Europe
2000s in Warsaw